The Court–Exchange Building (formerly the National Casket Company building) is a historic industrial and commercial building located at 142 Exchange Street (at the corner of Court Street) in Rochester, New York.

It is a six-story brick structure with Richardsonian Romanesque details designed by Harvey Ellis and built in 1881 for Samuel Stein, a local manufacturer of wooden caskets. When Stein retired in 1890, he sold his business to the National Casket Company. The building was used until 1984 to manufacture, display, and warehouse caskets.

It was listed on the National Register of Historic Places in 1985.

See also
 National Register of Historic Places listings in Rochester, New York

References

Industrial buildings and structures in Rochester, New York
Industrial buildings and structures on the National Register of Historic Places in New York (state)
Industrial buildings completed in 1881
Romanesque Revival architecture in New York (state)
National Register of Historic Places in Rochester, New York
1881 establishments in New York (state)